Ancasti or Villa Ancasti is a town in Catamarca Province, Argentina. It is the head town of the Ancasti Department.
It was founded in 1735, by Don Pedro Pablo Acosta.
The festival of the patron saint is celebrated annually on Christmas Eve, December 24.

Economy

The main trades in the local economy are agriculture and cattle farming. The biggest produce are maize, potato and squash.

External links

 Ancasti website

References

Populated places in Catamarca Province
Populated places established in 1735
Municipalities of Argentina